Jon is a 1983 Finnish drama film directed by Jaakko Pyhälä. It was entered into the 13th Moscow International Film Festival.

Cast
 Kari Väänänen as Jon
 Vesa-Matti Loiri as Heikki Öljynen
 Pia Tellefsen as Gunilla (as Pia-Beate Tellefsen)
 Nils Utsi as Raineri - fisherman
 Vesa Vierikko as Dietmar
 Timo Torikka as Kittilä
 Esa Pakarinen Jr. as Grieg
 Anne Beate Odland as Susanne de Wrees
 Randi Koch as Katrin
 Juhani Tuominen as Kettunen

References

External links
 

1983 films
1983 drama films
Finnish drama films
1980s Finnish-language films